ISCP may refer to:

 International Studio & Curatorial Program
 International State College of the Philippines
 Information System Contingency Plan - plan for re-establishing an information system service after disruption
 Islamic State – Caucasus Province